S4!Sash! is the fourth studio album by the German producer team Sash!. The album was a two-disc set, released in 2002. Three singles were also released from the record. The most successful single was "Ganbareh!", which reached No.43 in the German and Australian charts. "Ganbareh" featured vocalist Miko and was released on June 24, 2002.

Track listing
 "Overture" (featuring T.J. Davis)
 "Ganbareh" (featuring Miko)
 "I Believe" (featuring T.J. Davis)
 "The Sunset" (featuring Georgina Collins)
 "The Secret" (featuring Sarah Brightman)
 "Run" (featuring Boy George)
 "Rainforest"
 "Nessun Dorma"
 "Luna Llena" (featuring La Isla)
 "Habibi" (featuring DJ Sammy Sam)
 "Peace Of Mind" (featuring Kirstin)
 "Baila Loca"
 "Stop Pushin'" (featuring Marvin Broadie)
 "S4! Sash!"
 "The Walk"
 "Don't Be So Rude"

Credits
Artwork – Virgin Munich 
Photography by Adrian Bela Raba 
Produced by Sash!, Tokapi 
Written by Ralf Kappmeier (tracks: 1 to 5, 7, 8, 10 to 16), Sascha Lappessen (tracks: 1 to 5, 7, 8, 10 to 16), Thomas Alisson (tracks: 1 to 5, 7, 8, 10 to 16)

References

2002 albums
Sash! albums